Ramón Maximiliano Valdés Arce (13 October 1867 in Penonomé, Coclé – 3 June 1918 in Panama City) was President of Panama from October 1, 1916 to June 3, 1918. He belonged to the Liberal Party. He died in office and was succeeded by the first presidential designate, Ciro Urriola.

He was elected as the second presidential designate by the National Assembly for the term 1912–1914, and as the first presidential designate for the term 1914–1916.

References

1867 births
1918 deaths
People from Penonomé District
National Liberal Party (Panama) politicians
Presidents of Panama
Vice presidents of Panama